The Fournier RF 4 is a single-seater motor glider designed by René Fournier in 1966. It is an aerobatic version of the Fournier RF 3.

Design and development
Conceived as a motor glider and sport touring aircraft, the RF 4 was introduced in 1966. It is of all-wood construction and is fully aerobatic. The landing gear consists of a monowheel gear which retracts forward into a fibreglass cowling. The main wheel has a brake which is manually operated. There is a small steerable tailwheel and wing-mounted outrigger wheels.

Operational history
An RF 4D was flown by Mira Slovak across the Atlantic Ocean while participating in the May 1969 Daily Mail Air Race. The flight won a £1,000 prize offered by the London Evening News for the best performance in the race by an aircraft under  gross take-off weight. The main landing gear fork is an ongoing maintenance issue, with regular replacements needed.

Variants
RF 4
Prototype aerobatic variant of the RF 3, three-built by Alpavia
RF 4D
Production variant, 155 built in Germany by Sportavia-Putzer, D was for Deutschland. 16 shipped to America

Specifications (RF 4D)

See also
 Fournier RF 5

References

 Harrison, Neil. "In the Air:Number 230:Fournier RF 4D". Flight International, 2 May 1968. pp. 669–670.

1960s French sailplanes
1960s German sailplanes
Fournier aircraft
Sportavia-Pützer aircraft
Motor gliders
Aerobatic aircraft
Single-engined tractor aircraft
Low-wing aircraft
Aircraft first flown in 1966